The Pan American Institute of Geography and History (PAIGH,  - IPGH) is an international organisation dedicated to the generation and transference of knowledge specialized in the fields of cartography, geography, history and geophysics.

The institute was created on February 7, 1928, during a conference held in Havana. The city that was established to be the host was Mexico City. The Institute signed an agreement with the Organization of American States and became a specialized organization of the OAS; in 1974 this agreement was modified and signed.

PAIGH publishes the following academic journals:
Biannual publications
Revista Cartográfica
Revista Geográfica
Revista de Historia de América
Revista Geofísica
Annual publications
 Boletín de Antropología Americana
 Revista de Arqueología Americana y Folklore Americano

External links
Pan American Institute of Geography and History

Organization of American States
Geography organizations
History organizations based in Mexico
Cartography organizations
Geophysics organizations
International geographic data and information organizations